František "Franz" Straka (born 28 May 1958) is a Czech former football player and manager of Fotbal Třinec.

Biography

Playing career
Straka played most notably for Sparta Prague. In 1988, he moved to Germany and spent the rest of his playing career there. He played for Czechoslovakia and was a participant in the 1990 FIFA World Cup. He played total 35 matches for the national team from 1983 to 1990.

Coaching career
After retiring from playing, he began coaching. Straka led several top flight Czech clubs, including FK Teplice, Sparta Prague and Viktoria Plzeň. He also coached abroad in Austria, Slovakia and Greece. In 2009, he was selected as temporary manager of the Czech Republic national football team. On 30 June 2009, after only one game in charge he left the position. He won his only match, a 1–0 friendly over Malta on 5 June 2009.

In June 2010, he was appointed head coach of the North Queensland Fury in Townsville, Australia. He became a fan favourite in Australia, due to his affable personality and fashion sense. Straka was ready to lead the North Queensland Fury for another season, however the club folded in 2011 because of financial difficulties.

After speculation he was going to replace Ernie Merrick at Melbourne Victory, Straka returned to Europe, where he was announced manager of Polish Ekstraklasa club Arka Gdynia. In October 2011, he was announced as the replacement for Michal Petrouš as manager of SK Slavia Prague. His appointment as a new manager of Slavia sparked controversy and protests from Slavia fans, who saw Straka as a rival Sparta's patriot. Straka's appointment was also criticized by Sparta fans, who saw Straka as a traitor. After just five months in the job, Straka resigned in March 2012. Straka returned to the Gambrinus liga after a year's break in March 2013, joining bottom of the table side 1. FK Příbram. He lasted only half a year in this job before being replaced by their former manager, Petr Čuhel.

In December 2016, he was appointed as manager of Egyptian side Ismaily SC signing a 1.5-year contract. It was the first time position in the Arab region or Africa of his career.

Personal life
Straka holds German citizenship and is fluent in German. Fans often call him Franz Straka.

Honours

Managerial
Teplice
 Czech Cup: 2002–03

 Sparta Prague
 Czech Cup: 2003–04

Slovan Bratislava
 Slovak Super Cup: 2014

References

External links
 
 Profile at iDNES.cz 
 František Straka at Fotbal24.cz 
 
 

1958 births
Sportspeople from České Budějovice
Living people
Association football defenders
Czechoslovak footballers
Czech footballers
Czechoslovakia international footballers
AC Sparta Prague players
Borussia Mönchengladbach players
FC Hansa Rostock players
FC Viktoria Köln players
Wuppertaler SV players
1990 FIFA World Cup players
Bundesliga players
Expatriate footballers in Germany
Czech football managers
Czech expatriate football managers
Czech First League managers
FK Teplice managers
AC Sparta Prague managers
FC Viktoria Plzeň managers
SK Dynamo České Budějovice managers
SK Slavia Prague managers
1. FK Příbram managers
ŠK Slovan Bratislava managers
OFI Crete F.C. managers
Arka Gdynia managers
Rot Weiss Ahlen managers
Wuppertaler SV managers
Ismaily SC managers
Smouha SC managers
Czech Republic national football team managers
Expatriate soccer managers in Australia
Expatriate football managers in Austria
Expatriate football managers in Germany
Expatriate football managers in Greece
Expatriate football managers in Slovakia
MFK Ružomberok managers
MFK Karviná managers
Expatriate football managers in Poland
Czech expatriate sportspeople in Poland
A-League Men managers
Czechoslovak expatriate footballers
Czechoslovak expatriate sportspeople in West Germany
Czech expatriate sportspeople in Australia
Czech expatriate sportspeople in Austria
Czech expatriate sportspeople in Egypt
Czech expatriate sportspeople in Germany
Czech expatriate sportspeople in Greece
Czech expatriate sportspeople in Slovakia
FK Fotbal Třinec managers
Czech National Football League managers
Expatriate footballers in West Germany
FC Wacker Innsbruck (2002) managers